Teichelmann may refer to:

 Christian Gottlieb Teichelmann (1807–1888), a Lutheran missionary in South Australia
 Ebenezer Teichelmann (1859–1938), a surgeon, mountaineer and photographer in New Zealand
 , a mountain in West Coast Region, New Zealand